Erzya Language Day is observed on April 16 since 1993 mainly in Mordowia by the Erzya people, but also in other areas in Russia and elsewhere.

In 1993, the Erzya Language Foundation suggested that one day a year should be proposed to celebrate the Erzya language, in an effort to promote its preservation. April 16, the birthday of Anatoli Ryabov, creator of the Erzya language's Latin alphabet, was chosen as the annual celebration day.

Erzya Language Day celebrations often involve artistic performances, exhibitions, meetings, traditional music concerts, tastings of national dishes, fairs, etc.

See also 

 Erzyas
 Public holidays in Russia

References 

Awareness days
Erzya language
Language observances